The Temptin' Temptations is the third studio album by The Temptations for the Gordy (Motown) label released in 1965. The album includes several of the group's hits from 1965, and also includes a handful of singles that were not included on the Temptations' first 1965 album, The Temptations Sing Smokey. Among these are the 1964 singles "Girl (Why You Wanna Make Me Blue)" and "I'll Be in Trouble"; and the 1965 singles "Since I Lost My Baby", and "My Baby". Seven of the album's 12 tracks had previously been released as singles and their B-sides, though "My Baby" preceded the album only by a month.

Overview
The three pre-"My Girl" singles all feature Eddie Kendricks on lead vocals. "I'll Be in Trouble" was written and produced by Smokey Robinson, while "Girl (Why You Wanna Make Me Blue)" was a Norman Whitfield production. Both songs were Top 40 hits for the group immediately following the success of their first hit, "The Way You Do the Things You Do". "The Girl's All Right With Me", "I'll Be in Trouble's" b-side, charted on its own at number 102, and was written by Kendricks, Whitfield, and Eddie Holland, but produced by Smokey Robinson and Whitfield.

"Since I Lost My Baby", a heartbroken ballad exemplary of Smokey Robinson's work, features David Ruffin on lead vocals, pining away for a lost lover even though the world around him is a relative nirvana. Longing and melancholy, "Since I Lost My Baby" (written by Robinson & fellow Miracle Pete Moore) tells a story about the pain of losing a lover. Temptations lead singer David Ruffin paints a picture as the song's narrator of an idyllic world where he has everything anyone could ask for, except for love. Contemporary R&B singer Luther Vandross would later cover the song on his 1982 album  Forever, For Always, For Love.

"My Baby", an extension of the theme from "My Girl", features Ruffin and the Temptations bragging about the qualities of a special lady. It was written by Miracles members Robinson, Pete Moore, and Bobby Rogers .

"My Baby"'s B-side, the Paul Williams-led "Don't Look Back", was a hit in its own right, becoming a top 20 R&B hit and serving for several years as the Temptations' live-show closing number. It was also the original A-side of this recording, and as such, was performed by the group on The Ed Sullivan Show. It was later relegated to B-side status in the wake of "My Baby"'s bigger pop success at the time.  However, today, "Don't Look Back" is the far more popular and better-remembered tune. Although the Temptations retired "Don't Look Back" from their repertoire following Williams' 1971 departure from the group, several cover versions have been recorded. These include versions by Al Green, Bobby Womack, The Persuasions, and Teena Marie, as well as a collaboration between Peter Tosh, Mick Jagger, and Keith Richards for Tosh's 1978 album Bush Doctor.

Track listing

Side one
"Since I Lost My Baby" (Smokey Robinson, Pete Moore) (lead singer: David Ruffin) 2:55
"The Girl's Alright with Me" (Norman Whitfield, Edward Holland, Jr., Eddie Kendricks) (lead singer: Eddie Kendricks) 2:55
"Just Another Lonely Night" (Ivy Jo Hunter, William "Mickey" Stevenson) (lead singer: Paul Williams) 3:03
"My Baby" (Robinson, Moore, Bobby Rogers) (lead singer: David Ruffin) 3:06
"You've Got to Earn It" (Robinson, Cornelius Grant) (lead singer: Eddie Kendricks) 2:41
"Everybody Needs Love" (Whitfield, Holland) (lead singers: Eddie Kendricks, Melvin Franklin) 2:59

Side two
"Girl (Why You Wanna Make Me Blue)" (Whitfield, Holland) (lead singer: Eddie Kendricks) 2:23
"Don't Look Back" (Robinson, Ronnie White) (lead singer: Paul Williams) 2:56
"I Gotta Know Now" (Whitfield, Holland) (lead singer: Eddie Kendricks) 2:40
"Born to Love You" (Ivy Jo Hunter, William "Mickey" Stevenson) (lead singers: Eddie Kendricks, David Ruffin) 2:41
"I'll Be in Trouble" (Robinson) (lead singer: Eddie Kendricks; Melvin Franklin on last line of bridge) 3:00
"You're the One I Need" (Robinson) (lead singer: Eddie Kendricks; bridge vocals: David Ruffin and Paul Williams) 2:24

Unreleased recordings from The Temptin' Temptations sessions:
"Come Back My Love" (Berry Gordy, Robert Gordy) (lead singer: Eddie Kendricks) - produced by Berry Gordy, Jr.
"Nobody But You" (Clarence Paul, Sylvia Moy) (lead singer: Eddie Kendricks) - produced by Clarence Paul
"That'll Be The Day" (Henry Cosby, Moy, Stevenson) (lead singer: David Ruffin) - produced by Henry Cosby & William "Mickey" Stevenson
These three songs have subsequently been released.

Personnel
The Temptations
 David Ruffin – vocals (baritone/tenor/falsetto)
 Eddie Kendricks – vocals (tenor/falsetto)
 Paul Williams – vocals (tenor/baritone)
 Melvin Franklin – vocals (bass)
 Otis Williams – vocals (tenor/baritone)
with:
 The Andantes – additional backing vocals on "Just Another Lonely Night" and "That'll Be the Day"
 Jimmy Ruffin – additional backing vocals on "Born To Love You"

Producers
 Smokey Robinson – "Since I Lost My Baby", "The Girl's Alright with Me", "My Baby", "You've Got to Earn It", "Don't Look Back", "I'll Be in Trouble" and "You're the One I Need", Executive Producer 
 Norman Whitfield – "The Girl's Alright with Me", "Everybody Needs Love", "Girl (Why You Wanna Make Me Blue)" and "I Gotta Know Now"
 William "Mickey" Stevenson and Ivy Jo Hunter – "Just Another Lonely Night" and "Born to Love You"

Chart and singles history

 Note: There was no Billboard R&B singles chart from November 1963 until January 1965. Most discographies include R&B information from Cash Box magazine to fill in the gap in the R&B chart, as is done here with the 1964 releases.

See also
List of number-one R&B albums of 1965 (U.S.)
List of number-one R&B albums of 1966 (U.S.)

References
 Williams, Otis and Romanowski, Patricia (1988, updated 2002). Temptations. Lanham, MD: Cooper Square. .
 Williams, Otis and Weigner, Harry (2002). My Girl: The Very Best of the Temptations (Compact disc liner notes). New York: Motown/Universal Records.

The Temptations albums
1965 albums
Gordy Records albums
Albums produced by Norman Whitfield
Albums produced by Smokey Robinson
Albums produced by William "Mickey" Stevenson
Albums produced by Ivy Jo Hunter
Albums recorded at Hitsville U.S.A.